Cannabipiperidiethanone (CPE or 1-(N-methylpiperidin-2-ylmethyl)-3-(2-methoxyphenylacetyl)indole) is a synthetic cannabinoid that has been found as an ingredient of "herbal" synthetic cannabis blends sold in Japan, alongside JWH-122 and JWH-081. 

Its binding affinity was measured at the CB1 and CB2 receptors and it was found to have an IC50 of 591 nM at CB1 and 968 nM at CB2, making it 2.3 times and 9.4 times weaker than JWH-250 at these two targets respectively.

In the United States, CB1 receptor agonists of the 3-phenylacetylindole class such as cannabipiperidiethanone are Schedule I Controlled Substances.

See also
 AM-1220
 AM-1248
 AM-2233
 JWH-203
 RCS-8

References

External links
Water Soluble CBD Oil
Are CBD Buds Legal In Ireland?

Aminoalkylindoles
Piperidines
Phenylacetylindoles
CB1 receptor agonists
CB2 receptor agonists